is a Japanese retired football player.

Club career stats
Updated to 23 February 2017.

References

External links

Profile at Sagan Tosu

1986 births
Living people
People from Inzai
Ryutsu Keizai University alumni
Association football people from Chiba Prefecture
Japanese footballers
J1 League players
J2 League players
Sagan Tosu players
Association football forwards